The 1989 World Women's Curling Championship was held at the Milwaukee Auditorium in Milwaukee, Wisconsin from April 3–9, 1989.

After having lost the 1988 World final, the Heather Houston team, representing Canada, defeated Norway in the final to claim Canada's sixth women's world championship gold medal.

Teams

Round robin standings

Round robin results

Draw 1

Draw 2

Draw 3

Draw 4

Draw 5

Draw 6

Draw 7

Draw 8

Draw 9

Tie breaker

Playoffs

Semifinals

Finals

References

World Women's Curling Championship
Curling
World Women's Curling Championship, 1989
1989 in sports in Wisconsin
Sports competitions in Milwaukee
Women's curling competitions in the United States
Curling in Wisconsin
April 1989 sports events in the United States
1980s in Milwaukee
Women's sports in Wisconsin